Dracophyllum strictum, commonly known as totorowhiti, is a species of shrub endemic to New Zealand. It was first described by Joseph Dalton Hooker in 1844 and gets the specific epithet strictum for its rigid and packed together leaves. In the heath family Ericaceae, it inhabits lowland up to montane forest and shrubland and reaches a height of 50–300 cm.

References

Notes

Citations 

strictum
Endemic flora of New Zealand